Agrotis consentanea is a moth of the family Noctuidae. It is found on Madagascar and on the islands of the Cosmoledo atoll (Seychelles).

References

Agrotis
Moths described in 1880
Moths of Madagascar
Moths of Africa